The 1958 Louisiana Tech Bulldogs football team was an American football team that represented the Louisiana Polytechnic Institute (now known as Louisiana Tech University) as a member of the Gulf States Conference during the 1958 NCAA College Division football season. In their eighteenth year under head coach Joe Aillet, the team compiled a 7–3 record and finished as Gulf States Conference co-champion.

Schedule

References

Louisiana Tech
Louisiana Tech Bulldogs football seasons
Louisiana Tech Bulldogs football